Max Zweifach born Maximillian Zweifach known as "Kid Twist" and occasionally referred to as Zwerbach (March 14, 1884 – May 14, 1908) was an American gangster active in the early 1900s.

Early life
Born Maximillian Zweifach in the Austro-Hungarian Empire on March 14, 1884, to Austrian-Jewish father Adolf and Italian mother Hanna. With his family, he emigrated to New York in 1886 to escape the antisemitic riots, settling right below the Williamsburg Bridge on Delancey Street. Although Zweifach's father had hoped he would join the family tailoring business, Zweifach proved otherwise and was a prominent young thief by his teenage years.

Criminal career
Zweifach was first arrested on a charge of grand larceny in June 1899 on the suspicion of stealing a bicycle. When asked his occupation by the judge, Zweifach quipped, "Bicycles". Max pleaded guilty and was let off with a fine. Zweifach soon graduated into more serious offenses. Zweifach's right-hand man was his brother Daniel, aka Kid Slyfox. Tall and well-built, both Zweifach brothers led some of their friends during Election Day 1902 rioting to support Republican politician Sam Koenig in the Sixteenth Assembly District.

By 1903, Max Zweifach had picked up the nickname of "Kid Twist" and was known as a dangerous and cunning gang leader. On August 17, 1903, Kid Twist was charged with fatally shooting a rival gangster named John "Mugsy" Bayard during an argument after a card game. Zweifach was discharged on the grounds of self-defense and soon attracted the attention of gang boss Monk Eastman.

When Eastman was locked up for robbery the next year, Kid Twist found himself at odds with his old pal Richie Fitzpatrick over the leadership of the gang. This feud came to a head on October 30, 1904, when Fitzpatrick shot and wounded one of Kid Twist's men, Thomas McCauley, in a saloon dispute. Two nights later, Twist invited his rival to a peace conference at a saloon at 77 Sheriff Street. The meeting devolved into an argument. Fitzpatrick, realizing he was about to be hit, rushed out of the place. One of Twist's men, Harris Stahl, gave chase and shot him to death. Stahl would be acquitted of Fitzpatrick's murder several months later.

Kid Twist concocted a scheme to bilk the New York Central Railroad out of thousands of dollars, by having the owners of a nearby print shop distribute $4,000 of phony ticket passes to the public through scalpers. Twist and his partners were arrested in the spring of 1905 and charged with forgery. Ultimately, no one was convicted.

During his heyday, Kid Twist's top men included his brother Kid Slyfox, Harris Stahl, Big Jack Zelig, Ike the Blood, and Samuel Pristrich, aka Cyclone Louie, a former wrestler and sideshow strongman who was famous for twisting iron bars around his arms and neck. Cyclone Louie would later move in with Zweifach and his family at 255 Sackman Street in Brownsville.

Zweifach also began distributing his own brand of celery tonic to shopkeepers in his territory. The drink, packaged in bottles that bore his picture, was muscled in at exorbitant prices. Any store owner who refused to carry Kid Twist's celery tonic had his business trashed, or worse. Kid Twist also put the squeeze on illegal gambling games in his neighborhood. A case in point involved a Five Points gangster named Charles Greenwich, aka The Bottler, who ran a profitable stuss game on Suffolk Street. Kid Twist informed him in early 1907 that Harris Stahl was coming in as an equal partner in his game. The Bottler fumed but complied with this demand.

Some weeks later, Twist told The Bottler he was now out completely, and that another gangster named The Nailer would take the other half of the game. Greenwich barricaded the doors of his establishment and dared the Kid Twist gang to get him. On May 31, 1907, police interrupted an armed standoff between The Bottler and Harris Stahl. Both men were taken into custody and fined $5. The next night, the two men ran into each other at Suffolk and Broome streets and went for their guns. The Bottler wound up shot to death. Both Twist and Stahl loudly mourned the passing of their "friend" and festooned the stuss house with crepe.

Demise
Despite having a wife and child at his Brownsville home, Kid Twist was known as a ladies man around town, and it was this that would prove the end of him. Zweifach's regular girlfriend was a Canadian dancer named Carroll Terry, who also happened to be seeing Louis Pioggi aka Louie The Lump, an up-and-coming member of the Five Points Gang. Their romantic rivalry allegedly came to a head in the spring of 1908, when Kid Twist and Cyclone Louie got the drop on Louie the Lump in a Coney Island gin mill and amused themselves by forcing him, at gunpoint, to jump out of a second-story window. Soon after this, Louie the Lump confronted Carroll Terry at the Imperial Dance Hall and was told that she no longer had any interest in him.

In the late afternoon of May 14, 1908, Kid Twist and Cyclone Louie repaired to Coney Island to catch Carroll Terry's show at the Imperial. Afterwards, she hooked Louie up with a fellow dancer of hers named Mabel Leon, and the two couples went to a nearby Italian cafe on Oceanic Walk for dinner. The quartet left the cafe around 8 o'clock and began walking down the avenue. They did not see Louie the Lump until it was far too late. The Italian gangster darted out of the darkness and clubbed Carroll Terry sprawling with a fist. He then opened fire on the two gangsters. Kid Twist was fatally struck once behind the ear while Cyclone Louie was riddled with six bullets. Both men collapsed dead into the doorway of the South Brooklyn Hotel. Terry herself was struck in the hip during the barrage. As Louie the Lump made his getaway, a police officer yelled for him to halt. Pioggi whirled around and fired one shot, which ripped off the officer's helmet.

It has long been suspected that Louis Pioggi did not act alone that night. According to underworld legend, while Kid Twist and his party were having their supper, Louie The Lump got on the telephone to Paul Kelly, boss of the Five Points Gang, and asked permission to kill Kid Twist. A carriage full of Italian gangsters soon arrived at Coney Island, ready for action. Michael Cleary, the bartender of a nearby saloon, said he had indeed seen a carriage parked near the South Brooklyn Hotel before the shooting. Just after the killings, the driver jumped down from the cab and tossed Cleary a revolver, asking to hold it in case he was arrested.

Aftermath
Louie The Lump was arrested several days later in Saybrook, Connecticut. The two charges of murder were downgraded to manslaughter and Pioggi pleaded guilty. After receiving his sentence of eleven months in jail, Louie the Lump sneered that, "I could do that standin' on me head!" After the death of Kid Twist Zweifach, the Eastman Gang split into factions, continuing their feud with the Five Pointers. Leadership of the largest faction eventually fell to Zweifach's young protégé, Jack Zelig.

Years later, it was said that gangster Abe Reles took his nickname of "Kid Twist" from the long-dead Zweifach.

References
Asbury, Herbert. The Gangs of New York. New York: Alfred A. Knoff, 1927.
Kelly, Robert J. Encyclopedia of Organized Crime in the United States. Westport, Connecticut: Greenwood Press, 2000. 
Museum of the American Gangster, www.moagnyc.org, NYC
Sifakis, Carl. The Mafia Encyclopedia. New York: Facts on File Inc., 2005 
Sifakis, Carl. The Encyclopedia of American Crime. New York: Facts on File Inc., 2005. 

1884 births
1908 deaths
Murdered Jewish American gangsters
Eastman Gang
People murdered in New York City
Male murder victims
Deaths by firearm in Brooklyn
Austro-Hungarian emigrants to the United States